Human Cannonball is a fictional character, a supervillain appearing in American comic books published by Marvel Comics.

Publication history
The Human Cannonball first appeared in The Incredible Hulk #3 (Sept. 1962) as a member of the Circus of Crime, and was created by Stan Lee and Jack Kirby.

The character subsequently appears in The Amazing Spider-Man #16 (Sept. 1964), #22 (March 1965), The Avengers #22 (Nov. 1965), The Amazing Spider-Man Annual #2 (1965), Thor #145-147 (Oct.–Dec. 1967), Marvel Spectacular #15-17 (July–Sept. 1975), Super-Villain Team-Up #8 (Oct. 1976), Ghost Rider #72-73 (Sept.–Oct. 1982), and X-Men and Power Pack #3 (Feb. 2006).

The Human Cannonball appeared as part of the "Circus of Crime" entry in The Official Handbook of the Marvel Universe Deluxe Edition #2.

Fictional character biography
Jack Pulver was born in Burbank, California. He is a member of the criminal organization, the Circus of Crime, and works as a human cannonball and acrobat who specializes in being shot out of a cannon. He wears a costume and helmet that protects him from injury. He initially wears a red crash helmet and purple jumpsuit. In a battle with the Hulk, he has himself shot out of his cannon at the Green Goliath with no other weapon but a replica of Thor's hammer. The Hulk punches him right up through the top of the circus tent. This stunt, and subsequent dialogue, makes it pretty clear that Jack is not all that smart.

When the Circus of Crime next appears, Jack has changed his outfit. His costume is now orange and he has replaced the crash helmet with a metal bullet-shaped hat so he can use his head as a battering ram. It doesn't help him. Spider-Man and Daredevil ride him through the air like a bucking bronco and steer him into a crash with a group of circus rubes.

Frustrated by this defeat, Cannonball is more than willing to throw in with the Clown, Princess Python and Great Gambonnos. They kick the Ringmaster out and become the Masters of Menace, a name Princess Python thinks up, led by the Clown. With the Great Gambannos he robs some paintings as he is used to batter through a door and knocks out Jameson using his helmet, placing him in hospital. When Spider-Man attacks the Masters at their hideout, the web-slinger "wonks" Cannonball on the top of his bullet hat, crumpling it and knocking it down over his eyes. He rejoins the Ringmaster when he fails to lure Hawkeye, Quicksilver and the Scarlet Witch into the group. Quicksilver easily defeats him.

Cannonball and the Circus later battle a series of heroes including Luke Cage, Namor, and the Shroud, the Hulk, Howard the Duck, Power Pack, Generation X, Spider-Man, and Devil Dinosaur and Moon-Boy.

Human Cannonball later appeared as a member of Hood's crime syndicate.

Powers and abilities
The Human Cannonball wears padded steel armor to protect his head, shoulders, wrists and feet from the effects of his attack. The armor also offers some protection from physical attacks. He usually uses a trailer mounted air cannon to fire himself at opponents or onto buildings. He sometimes carries a mace to hit opponents as he flies by them.

In other media
 Human Cannonball appears in "The Incredible Hulk" segment of The Marvel Super Heroes.
 Human Cannonball appears in the Spider-Man episode "Carnival of Crime".
 Human Cannonball appears in the Avengers Assemble episode "Crime and Circuses", voiced by Bumper Robinson.

References

External links
 Human Cannonball at Marvel Wiki
 Human Cannonball at Comic Vine

Characters created by Jack Kirby
Characters created by Stan Lee
Comics characters introduced in 1962
Fictional characters from Los Angeles County, California
Marvel Comics supervillains